The International Valuation Standards Council (IVSC) is an independent, not-for-profit, private sector standards organisation incorporated in the United States and with its operational headquarters in London, UK. IVSC develops international technical and ethical standards for valuations on which investors and others rely.

IVSC is responsible for developing the International Valuation Standards and associated technical guidance. To ensure that the public interest is effectively protected, it also engages with other bodies active in the regulation of the financial markets to ensure that valuation issues are properly understood and reflected. IVSC works cooperatively with national professional valuation institutes, users and preparers of valuations, governments, regulators and academic bodies, all of whom can become members of IVSC and play a role in advising the Boards on their agenda priorities.

In developing its standards and technical guidance, IVSC follows a process of issuing discussion papers and exposure drafts for public comment.

The IVSC is recognised by the United Nations Department of Economic and Social Affairs.

Objectives and activities
The objectives of the IVSC are to strengthen the worldwide valuation profession by:

 Developing high-quality international standards and supporting their adoption and use
 Facilitating collaboration and cooperation among its member organisations
 Collaborating and cooperating with other international organisations and regulatory authorities
 Serving as the international voice for the valuation profession

Boards

Board of Trustees
The IVSC is governed by a Board of Trustees responsible for the strategic direction and funding of the organisation. The Trustees are also responsible for the appointment of the Standards Boards and Membership and Standards Recognition Board.

The current Board of Trustees comprises:

Alistair Darling (Chair)
Lim Hwee Hua (Vice Chair)
Kathleen Casey
Marcelo Barbosa
Ana Maria Elorrieta 
Jacque Potdevin
Zhang Genghua
Jay E Fishman
Narayan Seshadri
Ranjit Ajit Singh
Iseo Pasquali
Linda de Beer
Japheth Katto
Aiko Sekine

Notable former members:

Michel Prada (Chairman 2009 - 2011)
Sir David Tweedie (Chairman 2012 - 2019)

History
The origins of IVSC lie in the International Assets Valuation Standards Committee (TIAVSC) that was formed in 1981 with the objective of developing consistent standards across national borders. The founder members were a number of professional institutes mainly concerned with real property valuation. The Committee changed its name in 1994 to the International Valuation Standards Committee, and from the late 1990s started to include member organisations concerned with the valuation of assets other than real property.

Following a restructuring of the organization in 2008, its name was again changed, this time to the International Valuation Standards Council. As of 2022, the IVSC has over 180 organisations in membership from around the world. The organisations in membership accredit and regulate the conduct of individual valuers who specialize in the valuation of many different types of assets and liabilities, such as business interests, real property, intangibles, capital equipment and financial instruments.

The IVSC and the International Organization of Securities Commissions (IOSCO) announced a Cooperation Agreement in 2022 with a focus on enhancing international valuation standards and professionalism.

The International Valuation Standards
The International Valuation Standards (IVS) are international standards that consist of various actions required during the undertaking of a valuation assignment supported by technical information and guidance.  The IVSC's technical boards are responsible for the development and maintenance of the International Valuation Standards. The boards are independent and solicit public comment by issuing discussion papers and exposure drafts.

The latest version of the Standards (IVS 2022) was published in July 2021 and came into effect on 31 January 2022.

Objective of IVS
The objective of the International Valuation Standards (IVS) is to increase the confidence and trust of users of valuation services by establishing transparent and consistent valuation practices. A standard within IVS will do one or more of the following: 
 
identify or develop globally accepted principles and definitions, 
identify and promulgate considerations for the undertaking of valuation assignments and the reporting of valuations, 
identify specific matters that require consideration and methods commonly used for valuing different types of assets or liabilities. 
 
The IVS consist of mandatory requirements that must be followed in order to state that a valuation was performed in compliance with the IVS. Certain aspects of the standards do not direct or mandate any particular course of action, but provide fundamental principles and concepts that must be considered in undertaking a valuation.

IVS structure

IVS Glossary
The glossary defines certain terms used in the International Valuation Standards, but does not attempt to define basic valuation, accounting or finance terms, as valuers are assumed to have an understanding of such terms. Defined terms are Asset/Assets, Client, Jurisdiction, May, Must, Participant, Purpose, Should, Significant and/or Material, Subject or Subject Asset, Valuation Purpose or Purpose of Valuation, Valuation Reviewer, Valuer, Weight and Weighting.

IVS Framework
This serves as a preamble to the IVS. The IVS Framework consists of general principles for valuers following the IVS regarding objectivity, judgement, competence and acceptable departures from the IVS. The contents contain information on Compliance with Standards, Assets and Liabilities, Valuer, Objectivity, Competence and Departures.

General Standards
The five General Standards set forth requirements for the conduct of all valuation assignments, including establishing the terms of a valuation engagement, bases of value, valuation approaches and methods, and reporting.  They are designed to be applicable to valuations of all types of assets and for any valuation purpose. The General Standards are IVS 101 Scope of Work, IVS 102 Investigations and Compliance, IVS 103 Reporting, IVS 104 Bases of Value and IVS 105 Valuation Approaches and Methods.

Asset Standards
The Asset Standards include requirements related to specific types of assets. These requirements must be followed in conjunction with the General Standards when performing a valuation of a specific asset type.  The Asset Standards include certain background information on the characteristics of each asset type that influence value, and additional asset-specific requirements on common valuation approaches and methods used. The Asset Standards are IVS 200 Business and Business Interests, IVS 210 Intangible Assets, IVS 300 Plant and Equipment, IVS 400 Real Property Interests, IVS 410 Development Property and IVS 500 Financial Instruments.

Revisions to IVS
The IVSC Standards Board intends to continuously review the IVS and update or clarify the standards as needed to meet stakeholder and market needs. The Board has continuing projects that may result in additional standards being introduced or amendments being made to the standards in this publication at any time.

Members
The IVSC has an internationally diverse array of member organisations, which they classify as Valuation Professional Organizations (VPO), Associate Valuation Professional Organizations (AVPO), Institutional Members (IM), Corporate Members (CM), and Academic Members (AM).

Members can be sorted by country, name and member type by clicking on the buttons in the header of the columns.

Sponsors
The following organizations are listed as sponsors of the IVSC in 2022/23:
 American Institute of Certified Public Accountants
 American Society of Appraisers
 The Appraisal Foundation
 Appraisal Institute
 Appraisal Institute of Canada
 BDO Global
 Bloomberg L.P.
 CBV Institute
 CFA Institute
 China Appraisal Society
 DBS Bank
 Deloitte
 Ernst & Young
 Grant Thornton International
 Houlihan Lokey
 International Finance Corporation
 KPMG
 Kroll
 Lincoln International
 Mazars
 Multilateral Investment Guarantee Agency 
 OCBC Bank
 Organismo Italiano di Valutazione (OIV)
 Public Investment Fund
 PricewaterhouseCoopers
 Royal Institution of Chartered Surveyors
 Saudi Authority for Accredited Valuers (Taqeem)
 Sea Group Ltd
 Stout
United Overseas Bank

References

External links
 IVSC website

International organisations based in London
Real estate-related professional associations
Real estate valuation
Standards organisations in the United Kingdom
Valuation (finance)